Ogoki Post Airport  is located  northeast of Marten Falls First Nation (Ogoki Post) near the Ogoki River in Ontario, Canada.

Airlines and destinations

References

External links

Certified airports in Kenora District